Two ships of the Royal Navy have been named HMS Minos, after the Minos of Greek mythology.

 The first  was an early steam vessel, operating on the Great Lakes from 1840 to 1852.

In the Second World War, HMS Minos was a shore base at the Port of Lowestoft.

Royal Navy ship names